Sewellsville is an unincorporated community in Belmont County, in the U.S. state of Ohio.

History
The first settlement at Sewellsville, then called Union, was made around 1815. A post office called Sewellsville was established in 1834, and remained in operation until 1907. The present name honors Peter Sewell, the first postmaster.

References

Unincorporated communities in Belmont County, Ohio
1815 establishments in Ohio
Populated places established in 1815
Unincorporated communities in Ohio